Dámaso Rodríguez a Cuban American director who is the second Artistic Director of Artists Repertory Theatre, the longest-running professional theatre in Portland, OR. Before joining Artists Repertory Theatre, he was Artistic Director of Furious Theatre Company in Los Angeles, CA. He also served as the Associate Artistic Director under Sheldon Epps at the Pasadena Playhouse.  He is one of four leaders of color leading a LORT theatre in the United States today.

Career 
Rodríguez has directed plays at Oregon Shakespeare Festival, The Actors Theatre of Louisville, Pasadena Playhouse, Intiman Theatre and developed plays at South Coast Repertory Theatre, Playwrights' Center Minneapolis and American Conservatory Theater.

He is a recipient of the Los Angeles Drama Critics Circle Award, the Back Stage Garland Award, the NAACP Theatre Award, and the Pasadena Arts Council’s Gold Crown Award. He was honored as a Finalist for the Zelda Fichandler Award by the SDC Foundation and was named a Knowledge Universe Rising Star by Portland Monthly.

He is a member of the Stage Directors and Choreographer's Society (SDC).

Under Rodríguez's leadership, Artists Repertory Theatre received a $7 million anonymous donation in January 2018.

References 

Living people
American entertainers of Cuban descent
American theatre directors
Artistic directors
Place of birth missing (living people)
1974 births